The George David Birkhoff Prize in applied mathematics is awarded – jointly by the American Mathematical Society (AMS) and the Society for Industrial and Applied Mathematics (SIAM) – in honour of George David Birkhoff (1884–1944). It is currently awarded every three years for an outstanding contribution to: "applied mathematics in the highest and broadest sense". The recipient of the prize has to be a member of one of the awarding societies, as well as a resident of the United States of America, Canada or Mexico. The prize was established in 1967 and currently (2020) amounts to US$5,000.

Recipients

See also

 List of mathematics awards
 Prizes named after people

Notes

Awards established in 1967
Awards of the American Mathematical Society
Awards of the Society for Industrial and Applied Mathematics
Triennial events